In enzymology, a tropinone reductase II is an enzyme that catalyzes the chemical reaction

pseudotropine + NADP+  tropinone + NADPH + H+

Thus, the two substrates of this enzyme are pseudotropine and NADP+, whereas its 3 products are tropinone, NADPH, and H+.

This enzyme belongs to the family of oxidoreductases, specifically those acting on the CH-OH group of donor with NAD+ or NADP+ as acceptor. The systematic name of this enzyme class is pseudotropine:NADP+ 3-oxidoreductase. Other names in common use include tropinone (psi-tropine-forming) reductase, pseudotropine forming tropinone reductase, tropinone reductase (ambiguous), and TR-II. This enzyme participates in alkaloid biosynthesis ii.

Structural studies

References

 
 
 
 

EC 1.1.1
NADPH-dependent enzymes
Enzymes of known structure